This is a list of Scottish football transfers, featuring at least one 2019–20 Scottish Premiership club or one 2019–20 Scottish Championship club, which were completed during the summer 2019 transfer window. The window closed at midnight on Monday 2 September.

List

See also
 List of Scottish football transfers winter 2018–19
 List of Scottish football transfers winter 2019–20

References

Transfers
Scottish
2019 in Scottish sport
2019 summer